The Toyota C+pod (stylised as C+pod) is a two-seat battery electric kei car manufactured by the Japanese automaker Toyota. Its design was previewed by the Ultra-Compact BEV concept car from October 2019, and its production form was revealed on 25 December 2020. The first batch was sold limited to corporate users, local governments and other organisations in Japan. It is later sold to individual customers starting in December 2021.

Due to its dimensions, it qualifies under the kei car dimension category in Japan. It is the latest vehicle not to use up the maximum dimensions allowed for by the kei car regulations after the Subaru R1.

See also 
 Toyota COMS
 Toyota eCom
 Toyota eQ

References

External links 
  (Japan)

C+pod
Cars introduced in 2021
Kei cars
Hatchbacks
Electric city cars
Production electric cars
Rear-engined vehicles